Jessica Brooks is a British make-up artist. She was nominated for an Academy Award in the category Best Makeup and Hairstyling for the film Mary Queen of Scots.

Selected filmography 
 Mary Queen of Scots (2018; co-nominated with Jenny Shircore and Marc Pilcher)

References

External links 

Living people
Year of birth missing (living people)
Place of birth missing (living people)
American make-up artists
21st-century American women